The United States men's national water polo team is the representative for the United States of America in international men's water polo.

The team is the only non-European squad to win medals in the men's Olympic water polo tournament, most recently during the 2008 Summer Olympics, where they won a silver medal after losing the final to Hungary 14–10.

On May 7, 2013, USA Water Polo named Serbian Dejan Udovičić the head coach of the United States men's senior national team. Udovičić was the former head coach of the Serbian men's national team.

Results

Major tournaments

Competitive record
Updated after the 2019 Pan American Games.

Olympic Games

 1904 –  Gold,  Silver,  Bronze medals (Demonstration event)
 1920 – 4th place
 1924 –  Bronze medal
 1928 – 7th place
 1932 –  Bronze medal
 1936 – 9th place
 1948 – 11th place
 1952 – 4th place
 1956 – 5th place
 1960 – 7th place
 1964 – 9th place
 1968 – 5th place
 1972 –  Bronze medal
 1980 – Qualified but withdrew
 1984 –  Silver medal
 1988 –  Silver medal
 1992 – 4th place
 1996 – 7th place
 2000 – 6th place
 2004 – 7th place
 2008 –  Silver medal
 2012 – 8th place
 2016 – 10th place
 2020 – 6th place

World Aquatics Championships

 1973 – 5th place
 1975 – 8th place
 1978 – 5th place
 1982 – 6th place
 1986 – 4th place
 1991 – 4th place
 1994 – 6th place
 1998 – 7th place
 2001 – 7th place
 2003 – 6th place
 2005 – 11th place
 2007 – 9th place
 2009 – 4th place
 2011 – 6th place
 2013 – 9th place
 2015 – 7th place
 2017 – 13th place
 2019 – 9th place
 2022 – 6th place

FINA World Cup

 1979 –  Silver medal
 1981 – 4th place
 1983 – 4th place
 1985 –  Silver medal
 1987 – 4th place
 1989 – 8th place
 1991 –  Gold medal
 1993 – 4th place
 1995 – 4th place
 1997 –  Gold medal
 1999 – 6th place
 2002 – 7th place
 2010 – 4th place
 2014 – 4th place
 2018 – 6th place
 2023 – Qualified

FINA World League

 2002 – 5th place
 2003 –  Bronze medal
 2004 – 6th place
 2005 – 9th place
 2006 – 5th place
 2007 – 5th place
 2008 –  Silver medal
 2009 – 4th place
 2010 – 5th place
 2011 – 4th place
 2012 – 4th place
 2013 – 4th place
 2014 – 5th place
 2015 – 4th place
 2016 –  Silver medal
 2017 – 4th place
 2018 – 7th place
 2020 –  Silver medal
 2022 –  Silver medal

Pan American Games

 1951 –  Bronze medal
 1955 –  Silver medal
 1959 –  Gold medal
 1963 –  Silver medal
 1967 –  Gold medal
 1971 –  Gold medal
 1975 –  Silver medal
 1979 –  Gold medal
 1983 –  Gold medal
 1987 –  Gold medal
 1991 –  Silver medal
 1995 –  Gold medal
 1999 –  Gold medal
 2003 –  Gold medal
 2007 –  Gold medal
 2011 –  Gold medal
 2015 –  Gold medal
 2019 –  Gold medal

Minor tournaments

Competitive record
Updated after 2019 Summer Universiade

Summer Universiade

 1967 –  Silver medal
 1973 –  Bronze medal
 1977 – ? place
 1979 –  Gold medal
 1981 –  Silver medal
 1983 –  Silver medal
 1985 – 4th place
 1987 – 5th place
 1991 –  Gold medal
 1993 –  Gold medal
 1995 – 9th place
 1997 – 7th place
 1999 – 4th place
 2003 – 8th place
 2009 – 6th place
 2011 – 4th place
 2013 – 5th place
 2015 –  Bronze medal
 2017 – 9th place
 2019 –  Silver medal

ASUA Cup (UANA Cup)

 2005 –  Gold medal
 2006 –  Gold medal
 2009 – Event cancelled
 2013a –  Silver medal
 2013b –  Gold medal
 2019 –  Silver medal

Team

Current squad
Roster for the 2020 Summer Olympics.

Former squads

Olympic Games

  1904 St. Louis –  Gold,  Silver,  Bronze medals (Demonstration event)
 New York Athletic Club: David Bratton, Budd Goodwin, Louis Handley, David Hesser, Joe Ruddy, James Steen, George Van Cleaf. Head coach: Gus Sundstrom.
 Chicago Athletic Association: Rex Beach, David Hammond, Charles Healy, Frank Kehoe, Jerome Steever, Edwin Swatek, Bill Tuttle. Head coach: Alex Meffert.
 Missouri Athletic Club: Gwynne Evans, Gus Goessling, John Meyers, Bill Orthwein, Amedee Reyburn, Frank Schreiner, Manfred Toeppen.
  1920 Antwerp – 4th place
 Clement Browne, James Carson, Harry Hebner (C), Sophus Jensen, Mike McDermott, Perry McGillivray, Norman Ross, Preston Steiger, Herbert Taylor, Herb Vollmer, William Vosburgh. Head coach: Otto Wahle.
  1924 Paris –  Bronze medal
 Art Austin, Elmer Collett (GK), Jam Handy, Oliver Horn, Fred Lauer (GK), George Mitchell, John Norton, Wally O'Connor, George Schroth, Herb Vollmer (C), Johnny Weissmuller. Head coach: Harry Hebner (did not go) / Otto Wahle.
  1928 Amsterdam – 7th place
 John Cattus (GK), Harry Daniels (GK), Joseph Farley, Richard Greenberg, Sam Greller, George Mitchell (C), Wally O'Connor, Paul Samson, George Schroth, Herbert Topp, Johnny Weissmuller. Head coach: Perry McGillivray.
  1932 Los Angeles –  Bronze medal
 Austin Clapp, Phil Daubenspeck, Charley Finn, Harold McCallister, Wally O'Connor (C), Cal Strong, Herb Wildman (GK). Head coach: Frank Rivas.
  1936 Berlin – 9th place
 Kenneth Beck, Phil Daubenspeck, Charley Finn, Dixon Fiske, Fred Lauer (GK), Harold McCallister, Wally O'Connor (C), Ray Ruddy, Herb Wildman (GK). Head coach: Clyde Swendsen.
  1948 London – 11th place
 Kenneth Beck, Bob Bray, Ralph Budelman (GK), Lee Case, Chris Christensen, Harold Dash, Dixon Fiske, Edwin Knox (C). Head coach: Austin Clapp.
  1952 Helsinki – 4th place
 Harry Bisbey (GK), Marvin Burns, Bill Dornblaser, Bob Hughes, Edward Jaworski, Bill Kooistra, Norman Lake, Jim Norris (C), Jack Spargo, Peter Stange. Head coach: Urho Saari.
  1956 Melbourne – 5th place
 Bob Frojen, Jim Gaughran, Ken Hahn (GK), Robert Horn (GK), Bob Hughes, Bill Kooistra (C), Sam Kooistra, Bill Ross, Ronald Severa, Wally Wolf. Head coach: Neil Kohlhase.
  1960 Rome – 7th place
 Chuck Bittick, Marvin Burns, Ron Crawford, Gordie Hall (GK), Robert Horn (GK), Chick McIlroy, Ronald Severa, Fred Tisue, Ron Volmer, Wally Wolf. Head coach: Neil Kohlhase.
  1964 Tokyo – 9th place
 Tony van Dorp (GK), Ron Crawford, Dave Ashleigh, Ned McIlroy, Chick McIlroy, Stan Cole, Bob Saari, Dan Drown, Paul McIlroy, Ralph Whitney, George Stransky (GK). Head coach: Urho Saari.
  1968 Mexico City – 5th place
 Tony van Dorp (GK), Dave Ashleigh (C), Russ Webb, Ron Crawford, Stan Cole, Bruce Bradley, Dean Willeford, Barry Weitzenberg, Gary Sheerer, John Parker, Steve Barnett (GK). Head coach: Art Lambert.
  1972 Munich –  Bronze medal
 Jim Slatton (GK), Stan Cole, Russ Webb, Barry Weitzenberg, Gary Sheerer (C), Bruce Bradley, Peter Asch, Jim Ferguson, Steve Barnett (GK), John Parker, Eric Lindroth. Head coach: Monte Nitzkowski.
  1976 Montreal – Did not qualify
  1980 Moscow – Qualified but withdrew
 Chris Dorst (GK), Gary Figueroa, Steve Hamann (GK), Eric Lindroth, Drew McDonald, Kevin Robertson, Peter Schnugg, Terry Schroeder, John Siman, Jon Svendsen, Joe Vargas. Head coach: Monte Nitzkowski.
  1984 Los Angeles –  Silver medal
 Craig Wilson (GK), Kevin Robertson, Gary Figueroa, Peter Campbell, Doug Burke, Joe Vargas, Jon Svendsen, John Siman, Drew McDonald, Terry Schroeder (C), Jody Campbell, Tim Shaw, Chris Dorst (GK). Head coach: Monte Nitzkowski.
  1988 Seoul –  Silver medal
 Craig Wilson (GK), Kevin Robertson, James Bergeson, Peter Campbell, Doug Kimbell, Craig Klass, Alan Mouchawar, Jeff Campbell, Greg Boyer, Terry Schroeder (C), Jody Campbell, Chris Duplanty (GK), Mike Evans. Head coach: Bill Barnett.
  1992 Barcelona – 4th place
 Craig Wilson (GK), John Vargas, Chris Duplanty (GK), Mike Evans, Doug Kimbell, Charlie Harris, Kirk Everist, Jeff Campbell, Chris Humbert, Terry Schroeder (C), Craig Klass, Erich Fischer, Alex Rousseau. Head coach: Bill Barnett.
  1996 Atlanta – 7th place
 Chris Duplanty (Captain, GK), Dan Hackett (GK), Jeremy Laster, Kyle Kopp, Chris Oeding, Gavin Arroyo, Alex Rousseau, Rick McNair, Kirk Everist, Chris Humbert, Mike Evans, Troy Barnhart, Jr., Wolf Wigo. Head coach: Richard Corso.
  2000 Sydney – 6th place
 Dan Hackett (GK), Chi Kredell, Robert Lynn, Kyle Kopp, Chris Oeding (C), Gavin Arroyo, Brad Schumacher, Tony Azevedo, Wolf Wigo, Chris Humbert, Sean Kern, Sean Nolan (GK), Ryan Bailey. Head coach: John Vargas.
  2004 Athens – 7th place
 Brandon Brooks (GK), Wolf Wigo (C), Omar Amr, Jeff Powers, Adam Wright, Chris Segesman, Layne Beaubien, Tony Azevedo, Dan Klatt, Brett Ormsby, Jesse Smith, Genai Kerr (GK), Ryan Bailey. Head coach: Ratko Rudić.
  2008 Beijing –  Silver medal
 Merrill Moses (GK), Peter Varellas, Peter Hudnut, Jeff Powers, Adam Wright, Rick Merlo, Layne Beaubien, Tony Azevedo (C), Ryan Bailey, Tim Hutten, Jesse Smith, J. W. Krumpholz, Brandon Brooks (GK). Head coach: Terry Schroeder.
  2012 London – 8th place
 Merrill Moses (GK), Peter Varellas, Peter Hudnut, Jeff Powers, Adam Wright, Shea Buckner, Layne Beaubien, Tony Azevedo (C), Ryan Bailey, Tim Hutten, Jesse Smith, John Mann, Chay Lapin (GK). Head coach: Terry Schroeder.
  2016 Rio de Janeiro – 10th place
 Merrill Moses (GK), Thomas Dunstan, Ben Hallock, Alex Obert, Alex Roelse, Luca Cupido, Josh Samuels, Tony Azevedo (C), Alex Bowen, Bret Bonanni, Jesse Smith, John Mann, McQuin Baron (GK). Head coach: Dejan Udovičić.

World Aquatics Championships

  2005 Montreal – 11th place
 Brandon Brooks (GK), Ryan Bailey, J. W. Krumpholz, Jeff Powers, Adam Wright, Peter Hudnut, Rick Merlo, Tony Azevedo (C), Spencer Dornin, Brian Alexander, Jesse Smith, Nathaniel Bennett (GK), Shea Buckner. Head coach: Guy Baker.
  2007 Melbourne – 9th place
 Merrill Moses (GK), Peter Varellas, Dreason Barry, Jeff Powers, Adam Wright, Kevin Witt, Ryan Bailey, Tony Azevedo (C), Rick Merlo, Layne Beaubien, Jesse Smith, Brian Alexander, Genai Kerr (GK). Head coach: Ricardo Azevedo.
  2009 Rome – 4th place
 Merrill Moses (GK), Peter Varellas, Brian Alexander, Jeff Powers, Adam Wright, Justin Johnson, Layne Beaubien, Tony Azevedo (C), Ryan Bailey, Tim Hutten, Jesse Smith, J. W. Krumpholz, Genai Kerr (GK). Head coach: Terry Schroeder.
  2011 Shanghai – 6th place
 Merrill Moses (GK), Peter Varellas, Peter Hudnut, Jeff Powers, Adam Wright, Brian Alexander, Layne Beaubien, Tony Azevedo (C), Ryan Bailey, Tim Hutten, Jesse Smith, Shea Buckner, Andy Stevens (GK). Head coach: Terry Schroeder.
  2013 Barcelona – 9th place
 Merrill Moses (GK), Janson Wigo, Alex Obert, Alex Bowen, Matthew de Trane, Chancellor Ramirez, J. W. Krumpholz, Tony Azevedo (C), Shea Buckner, Tim Hutten, Michael Rosenthal, John Mann, Andy Stevens (GK). Head coach: Dejan Udovičić.
  2015 Kazan – 7th place
 Merrill Moses (GK), Nikola Vavić, Alex Obert, Jackson Kimbell, Alex Roelse, Luca Cupido, Josh Samuels, Tony Azevedo (C), Alex Bowen, Bret Bonanni, Jesse Smith, John Mann, McQuin Baron (GK). Head coach: Dejan Udovičić.
  2017 Budapest – 13th place
 McQuin Baron (GK), Johnny Hooper, Marko Vavic, Alex Obert (C), Ben Hallock, Luca Cupido, Thomas Dunstan, Nic Carniglia, Alex Bowen, Chancellor Ramirez, Alex Roelse, Max Irving, Drew Holland (GK). Head coach: Dejan Udovičić.
  2019 Gwangju – 9th place
 Alex Wolf (GK), Johnny Hooper, Marko Vavic, Alex Obert, Ben Hallock, Luca Cupido, Hannes Daube, Matthew Farmer, Alex Bowen, Chancellor Ramirez, Jesse Smith (C), Max Irving, Drew Holland (GK). Head coach: Dejan Udovičić.

FINA World Cup

  1991 Barcelona –  Gold medal
 Jeff Campbell, Mike Evans, Erich Fischer, Charlie Harris, Chris Humbert, David Imbernino, Doug Kimbell, Craig Klass, Robert Lynn, Kames Makshanoff (GK), Terry Schroeder (C), John Vargas, Craig Wilson (GK). Head coach: Bill Barnett.
  1997 Athens –  Gold medal
 Gavin Arroyo, Ryan Bailey, Chris Duplanty (GK), Dan Hackett (GK), Chris Humbert, Kyle Kopp, Chi Kredel, Jeremy Laster, Drew Netherton, Chris Oeding, Brad Schumacher, Peter Stern, Wolf Wigo. Head coach: John Vargas.
  2010 Oradea – 4th place
 Merrill Moses (GK), Peter Varellas, Mike Sharf, Jeff Powers, Adam Wright, Jeff Tyrell, Thomas Hopkins, Tony Azevedo (C), Ryan Bailey, Tim Hutten, Jesse Smith, Tommy Corcoran, Andy Stevens (GK). Head coach: Terry Schroeder.
  2014 Almaty – 4th place
 McQuin Baron (GK), Conner Cleary, Nolan McConnell, Alex Obert, Alex Bowen, Bret Bonanni, Josh Samuels, Michael Rosenthal, John Mann, Luca Cupido, Jesse Smith, Ryder Roberts, Merrill Moses (GK). Head coach: Dejan Udovičić.
  2018 Berlin – 6th place
 McQuin Baron (GK), Johnny Hooper, Dylan Woodhead, Alex Obert, Ben Hallock, Luca Cupido, Nic Carniglia, Alex Roelse, Alex Bowen, Ben Stevenson, Jesse Smith (C), Max Irving, Jack Turner (GK). Head coach: Dejan Udovičić.

Pan American Games

  1975 Mexico City –  Silver medal
 Guy Antley (GK), Peter Asch, Paul Becsahazy, Thomas Belfonti, Jim Ferguson, Steve Hamann (GK), Jim Kruse, Eric Lindroth, Mike Loughlin, Peter Schnugg, Jon Svendsen. Head coach: Pete Cutino.
  2007 Rio de Janeiro –  Gold medal
 Merrill Moses (GK), Peter Varellas, Peter Hudnut, Jeff Powers, Adam Wright, Kevin Witt, Ryan Bailey, Tony Azevedo (C), Thomas Hopkins, Layne Beaubien, Jesse Smith, John Mann, Genai Kerr (GK). Head coach: Terry Schroeder.
  2011 Guadalajara –  Gold medal
 Merrill Moses (GK), Peter Varellas, Peter Hudnut, Jeff Powers, Adam Wright, Brian Alexander, Layne Beaubien, Tony Azevedo (C), Ryan Bailey, Tim Hutten, Jesse Smith, J. W. Krumpholz, Chay Lapin (GK). Head coach: Terry Schroeder.
  2015 Toronto –  Gold medal
 Merrill Moses (GK), Nikola Vavić, Alex Obert, Jackson Kimbell, Alex Roelse, Luca Cupido, Josh Samuels, Tony Azevedo (C), Alex Bowen, Bret Bonanni, Jesse Smith, John Mann, McQuin Baron (GK). Head coach: Dejan Udovičić.
  2019 Lima –  Gold medal
 Alex Wolf (GK), Johnny Hooper, Marko Vavic, Alex Obert, Ben Hallock, Luca Cupido, Hannes Daube, Max Irving, Alex Bowen, Chancellor Ramirez, Jesse Smith (C). Head coach: Dejan Udovičić.

Olympics statistics

Results by tournament

Historical progression – best finish

Results by opponent

Number of competitors and average age, height & weight

Historical progression – returning Olympians

Historical progression – average age, height and weight

See also
 List of United States men's national water polo team rosters
 List of United States men's Olympic water polo team rosters
 United States men's Olympic water polo team results
 United States men's Olympic water polo team statistics
 United States men's Olympic water polo team statistics (appearances)
 United States men's Olympic water polo team statistics (matches played)
 United States men's Olympic water polo team statistics (scorers)
 United States men's Olympic water polo team statistics (goalkeepers)
 United States men's Olympic water polo team statistics (medalists)
 United States women's national water polo team
 USA Water Polo
 USA Water Polo Hall of Fame
 List of Olympic champions in men's water polo
 List of men's Olympic water polo tournament records and statistics

Notes

References

External links
 Official website

Men
United States